A talik is a layer of year-round unfrozen ground that lies in permafrost areas. In regions of continuous permafrost, taliks often occur underneath shallow thermokarst lakes and rivers, where the deep water does not freeze in winter and thus the soil underneath does not freeze either. Sometimes closed, open, and through taliks are distinguished. These terms refer to whether the talik is surrounded by permafrost, open at the top (e.g. a thermokarst lake), or open both at the top and above an unfrozen layer beneath the permafrost.

Supra-permafrost taliks
Due to climate fluctuation or change, some permafrost regions may develop an unfrozen layer between the seasonally thawing and freezing top layer and the permafrost. The layer is called a supra-permafrost ("above the permafrost") talik; it is different from traditional taliks, which are usually associated with water bodies, in that a supra-permafrost talik occurs because the ground that thawed in the summer does not completely refreeze in the winter. Calculations show that climate warming induces supra-permafrost taliks in intermediately cold regions. (In very cold regions, warming simply induces a deeper summer thaw without forming a talik layer whereas in warm, shallow permafrost regions, permafrost quickly disappears.) This type of talik has recently been observed in Russia. With time and continued increases in air temperature or snow depth, this talik layer becomes thicker and thicker and the deep permafrost layer eventually disappears. Findings from a scientific study suggest more common occurrence of open taliks within areas of fault zones and areas influenced by large rivers.

See also 

Frost heaving
Palsa
Pingo

References

Physical geography
Types of soil
Geography of the Arctic
Permafrost